The Golok River is a river that lies on the border between Malaysia and Thailand. It is spanned only by the Malaysian–Thai Friendship Bridge. The name of the river in Malay is Sungai Golok, meaning 'river of machete'.

The river borders the Malaysian state of Kelantan and the Thai province of Narathiwat. The friendship bridge connects the Malaysian town of Rantau Panjang and the Thai town of Su-ngai Kolok. Rantau Panjang is a duty-free zone.

The river flows into the Gulf of Thailand at Tak Bai District, Narathiwat Province. It floods seasonally with the monsoon. An unusually large flood occurred on 21 December 2009, causing an evacuation of parts of Kelantan.

The river originates in Titiwangsa Mountains of Sukhirin District, then flows through Waeng and Su-ngai Kolok with Tak Bai Districts. The area where the river flow through, especially Sukirin, it used to be a prosperous gold mine since pre-Second World War period. Although today it is not as busy as before, but the gold panning career still continues for Sukhirin residents. The villagers use their wisdom of gold dredging as an addition source of income such as promoting local tourism.

See also
 Malaysia–Thailand relations

References

Malaysia–Thailand border
Rivers of Kelantan
Rivers of Thailand
Rivers of Malaysia
Border rivers